Shin Sandalinka was an 18th-century Burmese Buddhist monk, who wrote the influential court treatise Mani Yadanabon in 1781. He held a high religious title, Zinalinkara Maha Dhammayazaguru (ဇိနလင်္ကာရ မဟာ ဓမ္မရာဇဂုရု, Pali: Jinalankāra Mahā Dhammarājaguru), bestowed by King Singu. He compiled the Mani Yadanabon from various sources, chiefly the late 14th to 15th century Zabu Kun-Cha treatise. His treatise was one of the four books to be machine-published by the Konbaung government in 1871.

References

Bibliography
 
 
 
 
 

Burmese Buddhist monks
Burmese writers